Duho is a proposed language family of South America, uniting two proposed genetic groupings, Hodi–Saliban and Ticuna–Yuri. This language family was proposed by Marcelo Jolkesky (2016), based on his previous but now disclaimed Macro-Daha family which had also included the Andoque–Urequena languages.

Zamponi (2017) concludes that the similarities between Saliban and Hodɨ appear to be due to contact, but that a distant genealogical relationship between Betoi and Sáliban is plausible though not demonstrated. He does not address Ticuna–Yuri.

Prehistory
Jolkesky (2016) suggests that the homeland of Proto-Duho was in the Serranía de Chiribiquete.

Language contact
Jolkesky (2016) notes that there are lexical similarities with Chibchan languages due to contact, which may point to the earlier presence of Chibchan speakers in the Orinoco basin.

Classification
Internal classification of the Duho language family by Jolkesky (2016):

Duho
Tikuna-Yuri
Karabayo
Tikuna
Yuri †
Saliba-Hodi
Hodi
Saliba-Betoi
Betoi †
Saliba-Piaroa
Saliba
Piaroa-Mako
Ature †
Mako
Piaroa

Pronouns
Jolkesky's Duho languages have shared forms in *ʧ for "I", *kʷ for "you" and *t for "we", which are found in all languages.

{| class=wikitable
|-
! language !! I !! thou !! he !! she !! we !! they
|-
! Ticuna
| ʧò- || ku- || dĩ- || ɡĩ- /i- || tò- || ta-́ 
|-
! Yuri
| tshuu || wikú || di  || -  || too  || -  
|-
! Saliba
| ʧ- || ũku, kʷ- || Ø-, i-, -di || x-, -x || t- || h-
|-
! Piaroa
| ʧ(u)- || (u)ku, kʷ- || Ø-, -de || hʷ-, -h || t(u)- || tʰ(a)-
|-
! Wirö
| ʧ(V)- || ɯkʷɯ, kʷ(V)- || Ø- || h(V)-, -h || d(V)-, -dɯtʰɯ || tʰ(V)-
|-
! Hodi
| ʰtæ || ʰkæ || dæ || - || ʰtai || hai
|-
! Betoi
| r(u)- || uhu, h(u)- || Ø-, -ri || Ø- || r-, -nuto || ?
|}

Lexicon
Several basic words in Duho languages appear to be related. The following examples are given, with further parallels in Sape:

{| class=wikitable
|-
! language !! tree !! mouth !! head !! hair !! path !! eat !! spirit !! offspring !! breast !! who !! what
|-
! Ticuna
| dãi || àː || èrú || ʧi || bã̀ || ɡõ̀ː || ã́ẽ̀ || dẽ́ || biĩ́ || tèẽ́ || tàː
|-
! Yuri
| noi || i à || gerühó  || ii  || -mó  || - || - || o nné || - || - || -
|-
! Saliba
| - || aha || iʤu || - || maa(-na) || ikua || õãĩ || nẽ(-ẽ) || omixe || ã-diha || ã-daha
|-
! Piaroa
| dawi || æ || u(-ju) || -ʦˀe || mæ(-næ) || ku || ãẽ || ĩtʰĩ || ami || di || dæhe
|-
! Wirö
| towi || a || u; -ʤu || -ˀʤe || ma(-na) || ku(-õ) || - || ĩtʰĩ || omu || ti || tahi
|-
! Hodi
| ʰtawɯ || a || ʰtu || - || ma(-na); -ma || ʰku-õ || ãwẽ(-no) || ĩni || me(e) || - || -
|-
! (Sape)
| tapa || itu || koyanukú, moynaku || pa || mu || ko/ku || - || katona || wi || pante || pemente
|}

References

 Jolkesky, M. 2016. Estudo arqueo-ecolinguístico das terras tropicais sul-americanas. Brasilia: UnB. PhD Dissertation.
 Zamponi, R. 2017 (2018). Betoi-Jirara, Sáliban, and Hodɨ: relationships among three linguistic lineages of the mid-Orinoco region. Anthropological Linguistics 59: 263-321.

Proposed language families
Indigenous languages of South America